is a luxury hotel opened in 1962 in Minato, Tokyo, Japan. It is operated by Okura Hotels and was a member of The Leading Hotels of the World. The historic main wing was demolished in 2015, with a modern replacement on the site opened in 2019, rebranded as The Okura Tokyo.

History 
Designed by Yoshiro Taniguchi, the historic 408-room Main Wing opened on May 20, 1962, while the 380-room South Wing opened on November 26, 1973. The hotel is located near the United States Embassy in the Akasaka area, and hosted every President of the United States since Richard Nixon, as well as numerous other foreign heads of state. The South Wing can be cut off from the rest of the building to serve as lodging for reporters and logistics aides, while using the penthouse "Imperial Suite" as high-security VIP lodging.

The hotel became a member of Pan Am's Intercontinental Hotels division on June 1, 1964, and would remain part of the chain until 1972, though it was never branded as an Intercontinental.

The hotel has also been the site of several major international summits and has also provided catering to international summits held off-site. In 1976 JVC chose the Okura Hotel for the launch of the world's first VHS videocassette recorder.

The original Main Wing closed in August 2015 for demolition, leaving only the smaller South Tower operating. Following a 110 billion yen ($1 billion) construction project, the hotel opened two new towers, with a total of 508 rooms, on September 12, 2019, in anticipation of the 2020 Tokyo Olympics. The Okura Prestige Tower is a 188-meter, 41-story mixed-use tower with 368 modern international hotel rooms and 18 stories of office space. The Okura Heritage Tower is an adjacent 75-meter, 17-story tower offering 140 traditional Japanese guest rooms.

The demolition plans were met with dismay by travel journalists, like Tyler Brûlé, who called the original "a masterpiece" and "one of the most loved modernist hotels in the world". Others lamented the irony of the iconic building and its "Orchid Bar", a favorite meeting place for the foreign diplomats from the many embassies nearby, being demolished at a time when shows like Mad Men have made the modernistic style of the 1960s highly fashionable again. The outcry helped raise awareness of the significance of the original design, and many interior elements of the lobby were painstakingly transferred to or recreated within the new exterior by Yoshio Taniguchi, the son of the original designer.

The hotel grounds also host the Okura Museum of Art, which houses a collection of Japanese and East-Asian Art amassed by industrialist Ōkura Kihachirō.

In fiction 

The hotel appears in Haruki Murakami's novel, 1Q84, and in Eric Van Lustbader's The Ninja.

In Ian Fleming's novel You Only Live Twice, James Bond stays at the Okura while in Tokyo.

In Barry Eisler's novel Zero Sum.

In the movie Walk, Don't Run, Cary Grant tries to check-in at the Okura two days before the 1964 Olympics in Tokyo and there is no room available.

Gallery

References

External links 

 
 "Save the Okura" on the Monocle website

Hotels in Tokyo
Buildings and structures in Minato, Tokyo
Hotels established in 1962
1962 establishments in Japan
Hotel buildings completed in 1973
Hotel buildings completed in 2019